Alar is the common term for Daminozide, a chemical compound that serves as a plant growth regulator.

"Alar" may also refer to:

Anatomy
Alar ligament, a connection between head and neck
Alar fascia, a layer of fascia
Alar plate (also known as alar lamina), a neural structure in the embryonic nervous system

People
Alar Kaljuvee (born 1961), Estonian volleyball coach 
Alar Karis (born 1958), biologist, civil servant, politician and sixth President of Estonia 
Alar Kotli (1904–1963), Estonian architect
Alar Laneman (born 1962), Estonian politician
Alar Nääme (born 1983), Estonian politician
Alar Rikberg (born 1981), Estonian indiaca player and volleyball coach
Alar Seim (born 1958), Estonian weightlifter and coach
Alar Sikk (born 1966), Estonian alpinist
Alar Streimann (born 1964), Estonian diplomat
Alar Toomre (born 1937), Estonian American astronomer and mathematician
Alar Varrak (born 1982), Estonian basketball player and coach
Deni Alar (born 1990), Croatian Austrian football player

Places
Allar, Jalilabad (also known as Alar), village and municipality in Jalilabad Rayon, Azerbaijan
Allar, Yardymli (also known as Alar), village and municipality in Yardymli Rayon, Azerbaijan
Aral, Xinjiang (also known as Alaer), city in Xinjiang, China
Alar del Rey, municipality in Palencia, Castile and León, Spain

Other uses
Lamborghini Alar, mid-engined sports car produced by Lamborghini LatinoAmerica

Estonian masculine given names
Disambiguation pages with given-name-holder lists